The Biennale of Sydney is an international festival of contemporary art, held every two years in Sydney, Australia. It is a large and well-attended contemporary visual arts event in the country. Alongside the Venice and São Paulo biennales and Documenta, it is one of the longest running exhibitions of its kind and was the first biennale to be established in the Asia-Pacific region.

History 
In 1973 the Biennale of Sydney held its first exhibition of 37 artists in the exhibition hall of the then newly opened Sydney Opera House.

1973, The Biennale of Sydney, Coordinator: Anthony Wintherbotham
1976, Recent International Forms in Art, Artistic Director: Thomas G. McCullough
1979, European Dialogue, Artistic Director: Nick Waterlow
1982, Vision in Disbelief, Artistic Director: William Wright
1984, Private Symbol: Social Metaphor, Artistic Director: Leon Paroissien
1986, Origins, Originality + Beyond, Artistic Director: Nick Waterlow
1988, From the Southern Cross: A View of World Art c1940–1988, Artistic Director: Nick Waterlow
1990, The Readymade Boomerang: Certain Relations in 20th Century Art, Artistic Director: René Block
1992/3, The Boundary Rider, Artistic Director: Tony Bond
1996, Jurassic Technologies Revenant, Artistic Director: Lynne Cooke
1998, Every Day, Artistic Director: Jonathan Watkins
2000, International Selection Committee: Nick Waterlow (Chair), Fumio Nanjo, Louise Neri, Hetti Perkins, Sir Nicholas Serota, Robert Storr, Harald Szeemann.
2002, (The World May Be) Fantastic Richard Grayson, Artistic Director
2004, On Reason and Emotion, Curator: Isabel Carlos
2006, Zones of Contact, Artistic Director & Curator: Charles Merewether
2008, Revolutions - Forms That Turn, Artistic Director: Carolyn Christov-Bakargiev
2010, THE BEAUTY OF DISTANCE, Songs of Survival in a Precarious Age, Artistic Director: David Elliott
2012, all our relations, Artistic Directors: Catherine de Zegher and Gerald McMaster
2014, You Imagine What You Desire, Artistic Director: Juliana Engberg
2016, The future is already here – it’s just not evenly distributed, Artistic Director: Stephanie Rosenthal
2018, SUPERPOSITION: Equilibrium & Engagement, Artistic Director: Mami Kataoka
2020, NIRIN, Artistic Director: Brook Andrew
2022, rīvus, Artistic Director: José Roca

13th Biennale of Sydney (2002)
The 2002 Biennale of Sydney titled (The World May Be Fantastic) investigated 'artists and practices using fictions, narratives, invented methodologies, hypotheses, subjective belief systems, modellings, fakes and experiments as a means to make works'. Writing in Art in America in October, 2002, Michael Duncan said of the exhibition that it "gave free rein to complex, often offbeat works predicated on alternate realities." Artists included: Mike Nelson, Chris Burden, Susan Hiller, Vito Acconci, Eleanor Antin, Henry Darger, Janet Cardiff and Rodney Graham. Richard Grayson was the Artistic Director.

14th Biennale of Sydney (2004)

The 2004 Biennale of Sydney was held from 4 June - 15 August and titled On Reason and Emotion. It featured the work of 51 artists from 32 countries. Much of the exhibition was sited within Sydney’s major art museums and galleries, however a number of new projects were created for specific sites at outdoor locations within the city, such as the Royal Botanic Gardens and the forecourt of the Sydney Opera House. Isabel Carlos was the Curator.

15th Biennale of Sydney (2006)
The 2006 Biennale of Sydney was held from 8 June - 27 August and titled Zones of Contact. It featured the work of 85 artists from 44 countries and was held across 16 diverse venues throughout Sydney including Pier 2/3, at Walsh Bay, the Art Gallery of New South Wales and the Museum of Contemporary Art. Dr Charles Merewether was the Artistic Director and Curator.

A record of 316,811 visits were recorded over all venues. The festival included a wide range of works and mediums including installation, sculpture, performance, video, sound, photography and painting. 53 artists created 80 new works specifically for the exhibition in response to the concept 'Zones of Contact'. The festival also featured three two-day symposia, over 50 talks, education programs and an 'Art Walk' along the harbour foreshore between principal exhibition venues.

16th Biennale of Sydney (2008)
The 16th Biennale of Sydney, Revolutions – Forms That Turn, took place from 18 June – 7 September 2008 with leading international curator and writer Carolyn Christov-Bakargiev as Artistic Director. It achieved record visitation of 436,150 and featured 175 artists from 42 countries.

Cockatoo Island, a former prison and shipyard, was used as a major new venue and won the Biennale a Sydney Music, Arts and Culture (SMAC) Award. Other venues included; Art Gallery of NSW, Pier 2/3 at Walsh Bay, Museum of Contemporary Art, Artspace, Sydney Opera House and the Royal Botanic Gardens. The 16th Biennale of Sydney was awarded Australian Event of the Year & Best Cultural or Arts Event at the 2009 Australian Event Awards.

17th Biennale of Sydney (2010)
The 17th Biennale of Sydney, titled THE BEAUTY OF DISTANCE: Songs of Survival in a Precarious Age, was held from 12 May – 1 August 2010. Under the Artistic Direction of international curator David Elliott, 444 works by 167 artist and collaborators were selected from 36 countries, making it the largest exhibition staged in the organisations 37-year history.

Venues included Cockatoo Island, the Museum of Contemporary Art, Pier 2/3 at Walsh Bay, Royal Botanic Gardens, Sydney Opera House, Artspace and the Art Gallery of New South Wales. The 17th Biennale of Sydney achieved record attendance of more than 517,000 visits across all venues with 68 artists premiering new works made especially for the exhibition. The 17th Biennale of Sydney’s SuperDeluxe@Artspace programme which combined gallery, performance space and bar was awarded Best Arts Event by popular vote at the 2010 Sydney Music, Arts and Culture (SMAC) Awards as well as being a finalist in the Best Major Festival category. The 17th Biennale of Sydney was also a finalist at the 2010 Australian Event Awards in the Best Cultural or Arts Event category.

18th Biennale of Sydney (2012)
The 18th Biennale of Sydney: all our relations, was held from 27 June – 16 September 2012 across five venues: Cockatoo Island, Pier 2/3, the Art Gallery of New South Wales, Museum of Contemporary Art Australia and Carriageworks. Under the artistic direction of Gerald McMaster and Catherine de Zegher,  225 works by 101 artists were selected from Australia, New Zealand, the Asia-Pacific, the Americas, Europe, South Africa and the Middle East. Nearly half the artists (49) created works especially for the exhibition, including many substantial collaborative installations.

The exhibition drew record crowds, with more than 665,000 visits recorded over five venues, an increase of 29 per cent on the 2010 attendance figures. The Biennale Bar @ Pier 2/3 was a popular after dark event taking place over five Friday nights in August. In the closing week of the exhibition, Carriageworks and the Biennale of Sydney presented the Australian premieres of En Atendant and Cesena, two performances by Belgian choreographer Anne Teresa de Keersmaeker’s dance ensemble Rosas.

The 18th Biennale of Sydney won the 'Best Cultural, Arts or Music Event' award at the Australian Event Awards in 2013.

19th Biennale of Sydney (2014)
The 19th Biennale of Sydney: You Imagine What You Desire was presented from 21 March – 9 June 2014, under the artistic direction of Juliana Engberg.

Presenting the work of 92 artists from 31 countries, the 19th  Biennale was shown at various partner venues including the Art Gallery of New South Wales, Artspace, Carriageworks, Cockatoo Island and the Museum of Contemporary Art Australia. Other works and events were experienced at various locations throughout the city, including Henrik Håkansson’s epic, episodic film and orchestral performance work, THE END (2011), which was presented at Pier 2/3 in Walsh Bay.

In 2014, more than 623,000 visited the Biennale partner venues, including close to 125,000 from overseas, the highest international visitation numbers recorded in the Biennale’s 41-year history. In addition, audiences also experienced outdoor works by Nathan Coley on the Eastern Apron of Cockatoo Island, and the building exteriors of the Art Gallery of New South Wales and Museum of Contemporary Art Australia, as well as numerous performance works in public spaces.

In 2014 calls were made by refugee activists for artists and others to boycott the 19th Biennale in response to the perceived 'chain of connections' between the Biennale, Transfield Holdings and Transfield Services, and the latter's contract at the overseas detention centres

Transfield Holdings, the private company, founded the Biennale of Sydney in 1973 and had continued as the Founding Partner since that time. In 2014, Transfield Holdings had an 11% investment in a public company, Transfield Services, listed on the Australian Stock Exchange. Transfield Services had, amongst many contracts, a contract for the Australian Department of Immigration at the detention centres on Manus Island and Nauru. The two Transfield companies had also joined together in the Transfield Foundation, which also supported the Biennale. On 19 February 2014, 28 artists participating in the 19th Biennale of Sydney published an open letter to the Board of Directors about their concerns with the sponsorship arrangement with 'Transfield'. The 28 artists stated in their letter "We urge you to act in the interests of asylum seekers. As part of this we request the Biennale withdraw from the current sponsorship arrangements with Transfield and seek to develop new ones."  The group of artists who originally signed this open letter were — Gabrielle de Vietri, Bianca Hester, Charlie Sofo, Nathan Gray, Deborah Kelly, Matt Hinkley, Benjamin Armstrong, Libia Castro, Ólafur Ólafsson, Sasha Huber, Sonia Leber, David Chesworth, Daniel McKewen, Angelica Mesiti, Ahmet Öğüt, Meriç Algün Ringborg, Joseph Griffiths, Sol Archer, Tamas Kaszas, Krisztina Erdei, Nathan Coley, Corin Sworn, Ross Manning, Martin Boyce, Callum Morton, Emily Roysdon, Søren Thilo Funder, Mikhail Karikis.

On 20 February 2014, 6 additional Biennale artists signed on to the open letter to the Biennale of Sydney Board, these artists were - Sara van der Heide, Henna-Riikka Halonen, Ane Hjort Guttu, Hadley+Maxwell, Shannon Te Ao, Yael Bartana. By 26 February 2014, 41 Biennale artists in total had signed this open letter. On 26 February 2014, five artists (Libia Castro, Ólafur Ólafsson, Charlie Sofo, Gabrielle de Vietri & Ahmet Öğüt) withdrew their participation in the Biennale of Sydney in protest. This protest was due to the artists' perception that 'Transfield' was profiting from the mandatory detention of asylum seekers and the Biennale's refusal to cut sponsorship ties with Transfield as requested by the artists. On 5 March 2014, four more artists (Agnieszka Polska, Sara van der Heide, Nicoline van Harskamp and Nathan Gray) withdrew their participation in the Biennale of Sydney.

In March, the Board of The Biennale of Sydney announced that it would cut ties with Transfield, following the growing criticism from artists and refugee activists. 
The majority of boycotting artists returned to participate in the 19th Biennale with the exception of Australian artists Charlie Sofo and Gabrielle de Vietri.

20th Biennale of Sydney (2016)
The 20th Biennale of Sydney was curated by Stephanie Rosenthal and took place in 2016.

21st Biennale of Sydney (2018) 
The 21st Biennale of Sydney, titled SUPERPOSITION, was curated by Mami Kataoka. It included soft sculpture works by the Yarrenyty Arltere Artists of Alice Springs and burial baskets woven by Yvonne Koolmatrie.

22nd Biennale of Sydney (2020) 
The 22nd Biennale of Sydney, titled NIRIN, was presented under the artistic direction of Brook Andrew. NIRIN was an Artist- & First Nations-led Biennale, celebrating First Nations artists. The programme was centered around seven themes: Dhaagun (‘earth’: sovereignty and working together); Bagaray-Bang (‘healing’); Yirawy-Dhuray (‘yam-connection’: food); Gurray (‘transformation’); Muriguwal Giiland (‘different stories’); Ngawal-Guyungan (‘powerful ideas’: the power of objects); and Bila (‘river’: environment), and it featured works by 101 artists and collectives, from 36 countries including for the first time Nepal, Georgia, Afghanistan, Sudan and Ecuador. The works were presented in six venues: Cockatoo Island, Art Gallery of New South Wales, the Museum of Contemporary Art (MCA), the National Art School, Artspace and Campbelltown Arts Centre. NIRIN went online after it was closed ten days after it opened due to Covid-19 restrictions. The founder of New Zealand collective FAFSWAG Tanu Gogo outlined concerns this pivot created for them including 'data-sovereignty, safe-space and intellectual property' but addressed their reprioritization to enable presentation and presented a successful project titled CODESWITCH: Relearn, Reimagine, Recreate - a FAFSWAG Manifesto for the 22nd Biennale of Sydney.

The Museum of Contemporary Art in Sydney featured artists including Tony Albert with Seed Indigenous Youth Climate Network (Australia), Denilson Baniwa (Brazil), Iltja Ntjarra (Many Hands) Art Centre (Mparntwe/Alice Springs, Australia), Kulimoe’anga Stone Maka (Tonga/New Zealand), Noŋgirrŋa Marawili (Darrpirra/Yirrkala, Australia), Aziz Hazara (Afghanistan), Tarek Lakhrissi (France), and Pedro Wonaeamirri (Andranangruwu (Melville Island)/Paluwiyanga, Australia) with Patrick Freddy Puruntatameri (Darwin/Melville Island, Australia).

23rd Biennale of Sydney (2022) 
The 23rd Biennale of Sydney, titled rīvus, was presented under the artistic direction of José Roca. Exhibits were held at various locations in the city including Art Gallery of New South Wales, Museum of Contemporary Art Australia, National Art School, The Rocks and Parramatta.

References

External links
Biennale of Sydney site
 Biennale of Sydney at Google Cultural Institute
Feature on 2006 Biennale of Sydney - Artkrush.com, June 2006
The Biennale of Sydney on Flickr
Biennale of Sydney YouTube Channel
  [CC-By-SA]

Australian art
Festivals in Sydney
Art biennials